This article contains a list of the known knights of the shire who represented Buckinghamshire in the Parliament of England and similar bodies of lesser status between 1290 and 1660. It also includes details of Parliaments from 1265 to which elected knights of the shires were summoned.

Preliminary notes
The parliamentary electoral constituency, representing the historic county of Buckinghamshire, was created in (1265): see Montfort's Parliament for further details and History of Buckinghamshire for maps of the historic county. This county constituency was represented by two knights of the shire until 1832 and three 1832–1885.

Knights of the shire are known to have been summoned to most parliaments from 1290 (19th Parliament of King Edward I of England) and to every one from 1320 (19th Parliament of King Edward II of England).

Although at some periods several Parliaments were held in a year, at others there were considerable gaps between Parliaments. Knights of the shire were also summoned to meetings which have not been classified as Parliaments by modern expert opinion. The names of the members in some Parliaments are not known.

The English civil year started on 25 March until 1752 (Scotland having changed to 1 January in 1600). The years used for parliaments in this article have been converted to the new style where necessary. Old style dates would be a year earlier than the new style for days between 1 January and 24 March, for example the Parliament of 18 March 1313 – 9 May 1313 (new style) would be 18 March 1312 – 9 May 1313 (old style). No attempt has been made to compensate for the eleven days which did not occur in September 1752 in both England and Scotland as well as other British controlled territories (when the day after 2 September was 14 September), so as to bring the British Empire fully in line with the Gregorian calendar.

The names of knights of the shire, taken from the list in The History and Antiquities of Buckinghamshire by George Lipscomb (unless a volume from the History of Parliament Trust on the House of Commons at a particular period is available), are given in alphabetical order for each group of representatives.

There are some minor variations in names from the source used, which unless the contrary is known, are assumed to relate to the same person. It is possible that some entries relate to different persons of the same name. Where such cases have been identified the persons have been distinguished by a Roman number after the name (in order of first election); except where the number used to distinguish different candidates of the same name during the same period, by the authors of the books on the House of Commons mention in the references section, are used.

As the dates of Parliaments came from a twentieth century source and the names of persons elected came from Lipscomb (published between 1831 and 1847) it was sometimes impossible to be certain, from those sources, who served in a Parliament and who attended other meetings accorded lesser status. There is also some uncertainty as to whether Lipscomb did or did not use new style years and if so whether the method used in his list is consistent. An attempt has been made to give the best fit possible and to indicate the year (and if necessary the number within the year) from Lipscomb's list. The places of some Parliaments were indicated in footnotes to Lipscomb's list and are given here as they may assist with further research to confirm the link between specific knights of the shire and a particular Parliament.

Knights of the shire 1265–1660
The lists below commence with Montfort's Parliament in 1265, when for the first time elected representatives from counties (or shires), cities and boroughs were summoned to Parliament.

It is known that the Sheriffs of the English Counties were ordered to send knights of the shire to attend a number of Parliaments before 1265, but they were not required to have them chosen by election. No such summonses are known to have required the attendance of some citizens of cities or burgesses of other boroughs. Records of this sort of summons survive for the Oxford Parliament which was the 7th Parliament of King Henry III (assembled 27 October 1258 and presumed dissolved when writs de expensis were issued on 4 November 1258) and the 16th Parliament of the King (summoned 4 June 1264 and assembled 22 June 1264, although the date of dissolution is unknown).

The lists before 1320 exclude Parliaments to which elected commoners (representing the Commons or communities of England) were not known to have been summoned. All Parliaments are believed to have been held at Westminster, unless otherwise indicated.

Parliament of King Henry III

Parliaments of King Edward I

Notes:-
 (a) 1st: For the first time since 1264–65 the representatives of the communities of the Realm are known to have been summoned to Parliament.
 (b) 2nd: The knights of the shires only were summoned to this Parliament. No summonses were sent to the cities and boroughs, for them to send representatives.
 (c) 19th: Knights only summoned 13–14 June 1290. Assembled 23 April 1290 Lords and 15 July 1290 Commons. This is the 308th Parliament, counting backwards from the Parliament elected in 2005. (Lipscomb-knights of the shire 1290). After this Parliament it became fairly usual for the representatives of the counties, cities and boroughs to be summoned to attend Parliament and from 1320 they were always included.
 (d) 29th: Model Parliament summoned 30 September, 1 and 3 October 1295. (Lipscomb-knights of the shire 1295)
 (e) 33rd: Summoned 30 September 1297 (peers) and 6 October 1297 (knights of the shire). Assembled 9 October 1297 Lords and 15 October 1297 Commons. Met in London. (Lipscomb-knights of the shire 1297)
 (f) 34th: Met in York. (Lipscomb-knights of the shire 1298)
 (g) 35th: Summoned 10, 11 and 13 April 1298.
 (h) 39th: (39th): Resignation of Pogeys, (1300) Gerard de Braybroke [I] elected. (Lipscomb-knights of the shire 1300:1)
 (i) 40th: Met in Lincoln. Dissolved 27–30 January 1301 (when writs de expensis were issued). (Lipscomb-knights of the shire 1300:2)
 (j) 42nd: Summoned 14, 20 and 24 July 1303. Met in London. (Lipscomb-knights of the shire 1302)
 (k) 43rd: (Lipscomb-knights of the shire 1305)
 (l) 45th: Assembled and dissolved 30 May 1306. (Lipscomb-knights of the shire 1306)
 (m) 46th: Met in Carlisle. Dissolved when writs de expensis were issued 20 January 1307 (burgesses only) and 19 March 1307 (knights only). (Lipscomb-knights of the shire 1307)

Parliaments of King Edward II

Note:-
 (a) 5th: (Lipscomb-knights of the shire 1309)
 (b) 8th: Met at London. (Lipscomb-knights of the shire 1311)
 (c) 9th: (Lipscomb-knights of the shire 1312:1)
 (d) 10th: (Lipscomb-knights of the shire 1312:2)
 (e) Robert Barry, ? (Lipscomb-knight of the shire 1313:1) not associated with a Parliament as far as is known
 (f) 11th: (Lipscomb-knights of the shire 1313:2)
 (g) 12th: (Lipscomb-knights of the shire 1313:3)
 (h) 13th: (Lipscomb-knights of the shire 1314)
 (i) 14th: John Blaket, Robert Malet (Lipscomb-knights of the shire 1315:1) or John Giffard, Nicholas de Turville (at York) (Lipscomb-knights of the shire 1315:2) uncertain which pair were elected to this Parliament and which to a meeting of lesser status
 (j) 15th: Met at Lincoln. (Lipscomb-knights of the shire 1316)
 (k) Nicholas de Turville (3), John de Olney (1) (Council at Lincoln) (Lipscomb-knights of the shire 1317) not associated with a body classified as a Parliament
 (l) 17th: (Lipscomb-knights of the shire 1319)
 (m) 21st: (Lipscomb-knights of the shire 1322)
 (n) 22nd: Met at York. (Lipscomb-knights of the shire 1323)
 (o) 23rd: (Lipscomb-knights of the shire 1324)
 (p) 24th: Met at London. (Lipscomb-knights of the shire 1325)
 (q) 26th: continued into the next reign (Lipscomb-knights of the shire 1326)

Parliaments of King Edward III

 continued from last reign-9 March 1327 (1st): Andrew de St. Liz (1b), Robert Malet (10b) (Westminster) (Lipscomb-knights of the shire 1326)
 15 September 1327 – 23 September 1327 (2nd): John de la Penne (2), Andrew de St. Liz (2) (Lipscomb-knights of the shire 1327:1)
 7 February 1328 – 5 March 1328 (3rd): John Blaket (1), Masculin de Chastillon (2) (Lincoln) (Lipscomb-knights of the shire 1327:2)
 24 April 1328 – 14 May 1328 (4th): John Blaket (2), Roger de Tourney (1) (York) (Lipscomb-knights of the shire 1328)
 16 October 1328 – 22 February 1329 (5th): John de Mareschal (1), James Freysel (2) (New Sarum) (Lipscomb-knights of the shire 1329:1) or John de la Haye (2), Andrew de St. Liz (3) (Parliament at York) (Lipscomb-knights of the shire 1329:2) or Masculin de Chastillon (3), Andrew de St. Liz (4) (Northampton) (Lipscomb-knights of the shire 1329:3) uncertain which pair were elected to this Parliament and which to a meeting of lesser status
 11 March 1330 – 21 March 1330 (6th): John Blaket (3), Roger de Tyringham (3) (York) (Lipscomb-knights of the shire 1329:4)
 26 November 1330 – 9 December 1330 (7th): John de Mareschal (2), James Freysel (3) (New Sarum) (Lipscomb-knights of the shire 1330)
 30 September 1331 – 9 October 1331 (8th): Masculin de Chastillon (4), James Freysel (4) (Westminster) (Lipscomb-knights of the shire 1331:1)
 16 March 1332 – 21 March 1332 (9th): John Fitz-Ralph de Mareschal (1), Ralph de Wedon (5) (Winchester) (Lipscomb-knights of the shire 1331:2)
 9 September 1332 – 12 September 1332 (10th): Richard de Chastillon (1), John de Cifrewast (1) (Westminster) (Lipscomb-knights of the shire 1332)
 4 December 1332 – 27 January 1333 (11th): John de Adingrave (2), Masculin de Chastillon (5) (Lipscomb-knights of the shire 1333:1)
 21 February 1334 – 2 March 1334 (12th): Masculin de Chastillon (6), John de Stretle (1) (Lipscomb-knights of the shire 1333:2)
 19 September 1334 – 23 September 1334 (13th): Thomas Blaket (1), Robert Malet (11) (York) (Lipscomb-knights of the shire 1334)
 26 May 1335 – 3 June 1335 (14th): Thomas Blaket (2), John de Stretle (2) (Westminster) (Lipscomb-knights of the shire 1335:1)
 11 March 1336 – 20 March 1336 (15th): Thomas Blaket (3), Robert Malet (12) (York) (Lipscomb-knights of the shire 1335:2)
 3 March 1337–c. 16 March 1337 (16th): Gerard de Braybroke II (2), John de Hamstede (1) (Lipscomb-knights of the shire 1336)
 3 February 1338 – 14 February 1338 (17th): William de Berkhamstede (1), Thomas de la Haye (1) (Council at Northampton) (Lipscomb-knights of the shire 1337)
 3 February 1339 – 17 February 1339 (18th): Philip de Aylesbury (2), Walter Poule (1) (Parliament at Westminster) (Lipscomb-knights of the shire 1338)
 13 October 1339–c. 3 November 1339 (19th): John Bryan (1), Richard le Warde (1) (Council at Northampton) (Lipscomb-knights of the shire 1339:1)
 20 January 1340 – 19 February 1340 (20th): John Blaket (4), John de Chetyngton (1)(Parliament at Westminster) (Lipscomb-knights of the shire 1339:2)
 29 March 1340 – 10 May 1340 (21st): Philip de Aylesbury (3), Thomas Reynes (1) (Lipscomb-knights of the shire 1340:1)
 12 July 1340 – 26 July 1340 (22nd): Philip de Aylesbury (4), Richard Passelewe (1) (Lipscomb-knights of the shire 1340:2)
 23 April 1341–27/28 May 1341 (23rd): Philip de Aylesbury (5), Roger de Tyringham (4) (Lipscomb-knights of the shire 1341:1) or Alan de Leaumes (2), Robert Malet (12) (Lipscomb-knights of the shire 1341:2) or Gerard de Braybroke II (3), Richard de la Vache (1) (Lipscomb-knights of the shire 1341:3) or Philip de Aylesbury (5), John Giffard (5) (Lipscomb-knights of the shire 1341:4) uncertain which pair of knights of the shire were elected to this Parliament and which to meetings of lesser status
 28 April 1343 – 20 May 1343 (24th): John de Chastillon (1), Richard de Chastillon (2) (Lipscomb-knights of the shire 1342)
 7 June 1344 – 28 June 1344 (25th): Philip de Aylesbury (6), Robert Malet (13) (Lipscomb-knights of the shire 1344:1) or John de Chastillon (2), Thomas de Reynes (2) (Lipscomb-knights of the shire 1344:2) or Gerard de Braybroke (x), ? (Lipscomb-knights of the shire 1345)uncertain which pair were elected to this Parliament and which to a meeting of lesser status
 11 September 1346 – 20 September 1346 (26th): ?
 14 January 1348 – 12 February 1348 (27th): Thomas de Reynes (3), Alexander de Sanderton (1) (Lipscomb-knights of the shire 1347)
 31 March 1348 – 13 April 1348 (28th): Henry de Chalfhunte (1), John le Veinour (1) (Lipscomb-knights of the shire 1348)
 Henry Fermband (1), Henry de Chalfhunte (2) (Lipscomb-knights of the shire 1349:1) and Henry de Chalfhunte (3), John le Veinour (2) (Lipscomb-knights of the shire 1349:2) not associated with a body classified as a Parliament
 9 February 1351 – 1 March 1351 (29th): ?
 13 January 1352 – 11 February 1352 (30th): Gerard de Braybroke III (1), Hugh de Kymbell (1) (Lipscomb-knights of the shire 1352)
 Gerard de Braybroke III (2), John de Hampden (1) (Lipscomb-knights of the shire 1353:1) and Geffrey de Lacy (1), ? (Council at Westminster) (Lipscomb-knights of the shire 1353:2) not associated with a body classified as a Parliament
 28 April 1354 – 20 May 1354 (31st): Geffrey de Lucy (2), ? (Lipscomb-knights of the shire 1354)
 23 November 1355 – 30 November 1355 (32nd): Geffrey de Lucy (3), Roger de Puttenham (1) (Parliament at Westminster) (Lipscomb-knights of the shire 1355)
 17 April 1357-8/16 May 1357 (33rd): John de Chastillon (3), Geffrey de Lucy (3)
 5 February 1358 – 27 February 1358 (34th): John de Hagmondesham (1), Roger de Puttenham (2)
 15 May 1360 (35th): ?
 24 January 1361 – 18 February 1361 (36th): Geffrey de Lucy (4), J. Hunt (1)
 13 October 1362 – 17 November 1362 (37th): Robert Barry (1), Nicholas Trimenel {1)
 6 October 1363 – 30 October 1363 (38th): Thomas de Arderne (1), Roger de Puttenham (3)
 20 January 1365 – 17 February 1365 (39th): John de Hampden (1), ?
 4 May 1366 – 11 May 1366 (40th): Thomas de Missynden (1), Roger de Puttenham (4)
 1 May 1368 – 21 May 1368 (41st): John de Arderne (1), Roger de Puttenham (5)
 3 June 1369 – 11 June 1369 (42nd): John de Arderne (2), Roger de Puttenham (6)
 24 February 1371 – 29 March 1371 (43rd): Fulk de Bermyngeham (1), Thomas de Reynes (4)
 3 November 1372 – 24 November 1372 (44th): Fulk de Bermyngeham (2), ?
 21 November 1373 – 10 December 1373 (45th): John de Arderne (3), Geffrey de Lucy (5)
 28 April 1376 – 10 July 1376 (46th): ? (The Good Parliament).
 27 January 1377 – 2 March 1377 (47th): ? (The Bad Parliament).

Parliaments of King Richard II

Note:-
 (a) 8th: John de Braybroke or Sir Thomas Sakevill, John Marche or John Tyringham uncertain which pair were elected to this Parliament and which to a meeting of lesser status.

Parliaments of King Henry IV

Parliaments of King Henry V

Parliaments of King Henry VI

Parliaments of King Edward IV

Parliament of King Richard III

Parliaments of King Henry VII

Parliaments of King Henry VIII

Note:-
 (a) Windsor was created 1st Baron Windsor 3 November 1529.

Parliaments of King Edward VI

Note:-
 (a) Lee died in office.

Parliaments of Queen Mary I

Parliaments of Queen Elizabeth I

Parliaments of King James I

Notes:-
 (a) Goodwin was declared not duly elected.
 (b) Pigott was expelled from the House of Commons.

Parliaments of King Charles I

Parliaments of the Commonwealth
The Long Parliament or the selection of members from it known as the Rump Parliament functioned de facto during part of the Commonwealth of England period. It existed (in a sense) de jure 1640–1660, as under a pre-English Civil War law, the Long Parliament could not be lawfully dissolved without its own consent which it did not give until 1660. As it was a Parliament originally summoned by King Charles I, the overall dates of the Long Parliament are given in the previous section.

The Barebones Parliament was an appointed body, so the county was not as such represented in it. That body was summoned on 20 June 1653, first met on 4 July 1653 and was dissolved on 12 December 1653.

Parliaments of the Protectorate
During the Protectorate the county was allocated five representatives in the First and the Second Protectorate Parliaments (summoned 1 June 1654 and 10 July 1656 respectively), before reverting to two for the Third Protectorate Parliament (summoned 9 December 1658).

The boroughs of Aylesbury, Buckingham Town and Wycombe retained one seat each in the first two Parliaments, but the traditional pattern of constituencies and of seats was reintroduced for the third.

Index
 John de Adingrave 1313:3 1333:1
 Philip de Aylesbury 1324 1338 1340:1 1340:2 1341:1 1341:4 1344:1
 Robert Barry 1297 1313:1
 Miles de Beauchamp 1307 1314
 William Beauchamp 1306
 Ralph de Bellofago 1312:1
 William de Berkhamstede 1337
 John Blaket 1315:1 1327:2 1328 1329:4 1339:2
 Thomas Blaket 1334 1335:1 1335:2
 Laurence de Bluntesdene 1295 1298
 Gerard de Braybroke I 1300:1 1300:2
 Gerard de Braybroke II 1309 1336 1341:3
 Gerard de Braybroke ? 1345
 Gerard de Braybroke III 1352 1353:1
 John Bryan 1339:1
 Henry de Chalfhunte 1348 1349:1 1349:2
 Hugh de Chastillon 1300:1 1300:2
 John de Chastillon 1342 1344:2
 Masculin de Chastillon 1313:3 1327:2 1329:3 1331:1 1333:1 1333:2
 Richard de Chastillon 1332 1342
 John de Chetewood 1298 1302
 John de Chetyngton 1339:2
 John de Cifrewast 1332
 Henry Fermband 1349:1
 James Freysel 1325 1329:1 1330 1331:1
 John Giffard 1306 1309 1315:2 (de Boef) 1316 1341:4
 John de Hampden 1353:1
 John de Hamstede 1336
 John de la Haye 1319 1329:2
 Thomas de la Haye 1337
 Hugh de Kymbell 1352
 Geffrey de Lacy 1353:2 1354 1355
 Alan de Leaumes 1323 1341:2
 Robert Malet 1311 1312:1 1312:2 1313:2 1314 1315:1 1322 1323 1324 1326 1334 1335:2 1341:2 1344:1
 John de Mareschal (1) 1329:1 1330
 John Fitz-Ralph de Mareschal 1331:2
 John Neyrunt 1305
 Amery de Nowers 1297
 John de Olney 1317
 Richard Passelewe 1340:2
 John de Pateshulle 1290
 John de la Penne 1319 1327:1
 Robert Pogeys 1300:1
 Walter Poule 1338
 Roger de Puttenham 1355
 Thomas de Reynes 1340:1 1344:2 1347
 Andrew de St. Liz 1326 1327:1 1329:2 1329:3
 Thomas de Sakevill 1325
 Alexander de Sanderton 1347
 William de Santresdon 1302
 John de Stretle 1333:2 1335:1
 Robert de Tothale 1313:2
 Roger de Tourney 1328
 Nicholas de Turville 1315:2 1316 1317
 William de Turville 1290
 Roger de Tyringham 1295 1305 1329:4 1341:1
 Richard de la Vache 1341:3
 John le Veinour 1348 1349:2
 Richard le Warde 1339:1
 Ralph de Wedon 1307 1311 1312:2 1322 1331:2

See also
 List of MPs for Buckinghamshire- MPs from 1660 onwards.
 List of former United Kingdom Parliament constituencies
 Unreformed House of Commons
 List of parliaments of England
 Duration of English parliaments before 1660

References
 The History and Antiquities of Buckinghamshire, Vol. 1, by George Lipscomb (1847)
 The House of Commons 1509–1558, by S.T. Bindoff (Secker & Warburg 1982)
 The House of Commons 1558–1603, by P.W. Hasler (HMSO 1981)

Parliamentary constituencies in South East England (historic)
History of Buckinghamshire